Murray Street is one of four north-west roads within the Hobart City Centre (CBD). The street is named for Captain John Murray, commandant at Hobart Town, by Lachlan Macquarie. One of Hobart's original seven streets, Murray Street was formalised by surveyor James Meehan (1774-1826) on 25 November 1811.

The street contains entrances to two central shopping arcades, Centrepoint and the Cat & Fiddle Arcade. Historic landmarks include St David's Cathedral (1874), Customs House Hotel (1846), T & G Mutual Life building (1937), Victoria Tavern (1836), Hadley's Orient Hotel (1862), the former Savings Bank (1859) and the Treasury buildings (1823-1940). Modern buildings include Ogilvie Jennings, the State Library of Tasmania and Parliament Square.

History
At the instruction of Governor Lachlan Macquarie to formalise Hobart's original city grid, a comprehensive town plan was drawn by surveyor James Meehan (1774-1826) in 1811.
Running northwest to southeast, the streets of Argyle, Elizabeth, Murray and Harrington intersecting the northeast to southwest streets of Collins, Macquarie and Liverpool were all formalised on 25 November 1811.

10 Murray Street

10 Murray Street was a brutalist office building designed by Dirk Bolt, located behind Parliament House and close to Salamanca Place. The building was fully occupied by the State Government of Tasmania. Located next to Parliament House, the buildings were directly linked via a skyway.
In spite public protest, 10 Murray Street was demolished in 2018 as part of the Parliament Square redevelopment.

2007 Myer fire
On 22 September 2007, Myer's Liverpool Street building in Hobart was destroyed by a fire that is believed to have started in the cosmetic section. Building damage was estimated at $50 million, and most stock was destroyed. The building including its historic façade was subsequently demolished. The adjacent buildings facing Murray Street suffered substantial smoke and water damage. Within a day of the fire, Myer issued a statement saying it would rebuild, and the Murray Street section of the store reopened on 16 November – 44 days after the fire. A new  five-level Myer store finally reopened in November 2015.

39 Murray Street

James Backhouse, a botanist and minister for the Religious Society of Friends bought a weatherboard cottage at 39 Murray Street to serve as a Friends meeting house in 1837. A sandstone building for the society was later erected on the site in 1880. It was sold in the 1950s and subsequently demolished. Today, a 12 story office building stands at its location on the corner of Collins Street. Constructed in the 1960s, the multi-tenanted property is anchored by barristers and solicitors Ogilvie Jennings, who currently hold naming rights to the commercial building.

Savings Bank
The Hobart Savings Bank was established in 1845 by a group of Hobart entrepreneurs headed by George Washington Walker, a Quaker, and members of the Society of Friends.
The sandstone building at 26 Murray Street was erected in 1859.
The bank changed its name to the Savings Bank of Tasmania in 1971, later amalgamating with the Tasmania Bank to form the Trust Bank of Tasmania in 1991.

Red Awnings
In 2011, the proprietors of the old Savings Bank of Tasmania erroneously affixed red awnings to the heritage-listed structure on the Murray St building. The public and Hobart City Council warmly supported the proposal for retroactive approval, but it was the subject of a drawn-out court battle with the Heritage Council, lasting until 2018.

T & G Mutual Life building

Designed by architectural company A & K Henderson, construction commenced for the art deco T & G Mutual Life building on the corner of Collins Street in 1937.
Featuring a stepped corner clocktower, the building officially opened in 1938.

Hoyts Mid City
Redeveloped by architect Ron Monborough in the basement of the T & G Building, a single-screen cinema operated by Hoyts opened in October 1982 with The Man from Snowy River. Hoyts Mid City was originally decorated in bold blue and red colours with extensive use of mirrors and chrome, and able to seat over 400 patrons. It was closed in the 1990s and converted into a basement carpark.

Victoria Tavern
The Victoria Tavern has operated continuously under its original licensed name since 1836.

References

Further reading
 
 
 
 
 

Streets in Hobart